The HaSharon Junction, commonly known as Beit Lid Junction, is a key road junction in the Sharon region of Israel. It intersects Highway 4 and Highway 57. The junction serves as a large transportation hub for dozens of Egged and Kavim buses.

On the southwest corner of the junction is Ashmoret Prison, a civilian jail.

The junction was the scene of the Beit Lid suicide bombing, a 1995 attack by Palestinian Islamic Jihad.

It is planned that in the future, a large interchange will replace the current intersection. It will be located slightly north of the existing junction, along a new alignment of Highway 57, which will be shifted to the north.

Buses
The following buses stop at the Beit Lid Junction. The junction itself does not have routes using it as a starting or ending station.

Egged

Nativ Express

Road junctions in Israel
Geography of Central District (Israel)